Fitch Johnson Daviz Barace Arboleda (born 4 January 1993) is a Filipino footballer who plays as a midfielder for Philippines Football League (PFL) club Kaya–Iloilo and the Philippines national team.

International career
Arboleda scored a hat-trick against Cambodia, although the Philippines lost 5-3. In the U22 AFC qualifiers he scored against Cambodia again in a 3-1 loss.

Arboleda also represented the Philippines at u-23 level at the 2015 SEA Games.

Arboleda came in as a substitute Misagh Bahadoran in a friendly match against the Kyrgyzstan on September 6, 2016.

International goals

Career statistics

Club

References

1993 births
Living people
Filipino footballers
Philippines international footballers
Stallion Laguna F.C. players
Association football midfielders
Sportspeople from Romblon